Leslie Ames may refer to:

Les Ames (1905–1990), English wicket-keeper and batsman
Leslie Ames, pseudonym of Canadian writer W. E. D. Ross (1912–1995)